Vernon-Verona-Sherrill Central School District is a school district in Verona, New York.

Its service area includes Verona, Sherrill, Vernon, Kirkland, Vienna, Westmoreland, and sections of Oneida and Rome.

It operates the following schools:
E.A. McAllister Elementary School in Sherrill
J.D. George Elementary School in Verona
Vernon Elementary School, also known as W.A. Wettel Elementary School, in Vernon
Vernon-Verona-Sherrill Middle School
Vernon-Verona-Sherrill High School

References

External links

School districts in New York (state)
Schools in Oneida County, New York